UTD may refer to:

Togolese Union for Democracy (UTD)
University of Texas at Dallas (or UTD)
Uniform theory of diffraction (or UTD), in optics
Unified Team Diving (or UTD)
Utd or United, has many possible meanings, see United (disambiguation)

See also
Utd. State 90, the 1990 US version of the Ninety album by 808 State
Radio UTD, the student-run internet-only radio station of the University of Texas at Dallas 
Under the Dome